Bijan (also Bizhan or Bejan) is a Persian given name meaning "Hero". People named Bijan include:

Bijan (designer), surname Pakzad, a fashion and perfume designer
Bijan Abdolkarimi, philosopher
Bijan Beg Saakadze, Safavid noble and officeholder
Bijan Beg (son of Rostam Khan), Safavid official
Bijan Daneshmand, actor 
Bijan Emkanian, actor
Bijan Jalali, poet
Bijan Jazani, intellectual
Bijan Kamkar, musician
Bijan Kian, businessman involved in American politics, notably associated with the administration of Donald Trump
Bijan Mortazavi, violinist and singer
Bijan Namdar Zangeneh, politician
Bijan Robinson (born 2002), American football player
Bijan Sabet, American venture capitalist and diplomat
Bijan Nobaveh-Vatan, politician

In literature 
Bijan, a character in Bijan and Manijeh, a love story in the Persian epic poem Shahnameh

Persian masculine given names